Sleipnir is  an eight-legged horse in Norse mythology. 

Sleipnir or Sleipner may also refer to:

Places
 Sleipner Glacier, Greenland
 Sleipnir Glacier, Antarctica

Ships and offshore
 Sleipner gas field
 Sleipner A, an offshore platform
 , three different warships in service with the Royal Norwegian Navy between 1877 and 1992
 , a class of Norwegian destroyers
 , a class of corvettes
 , a passenger catamaran
 , a large crane vessel owned and operated by Heerema

Sports
 IK Sleipner, a Swedish sports club
 SK Sleipner, a Norwegian sports club; see Kampforbundet for Rød Sportsenhet

Other uses
 Sleipnir (web browser)
 Sleipnir, a type of horse enemy in Final Fantasy XII
 Uddeholm Sleipner, a tool steel grade; see Uddeholms AB § Reference to international tool steel standards